Ivana Xennia Gallardo Cruchet (born 20 July 1993) is a Chilean athlete competing in the shot put and discus throw. She has won several medals on continental level in addition to representing her country at the 2022 World Indoor Championships.

International competitions

Personal bests
Outdoor
Shot put – 17.60 (Santiago de Chile 2021)
Discus throw – 55.26 (Santiago de Chile 2019)
Indoor
Shot put – 17.03 (Cochabamba 2022)

References

1993 births
Living people
Chilean female shot putters
Chilean female discus throwers
People from Osorno, Chile
Athletes (track and field) at the 2019 Pan American Games
20th-century Chilean women
21st-century Chilean women